Kaceli is a surname. Notable people with the surname include:

 Sadik Kaceli (1914–2000), Albanian painter
 Jonuz Kaceli (1908–1951), Albanian businessman